Le Dernier cri  is a 2006 film from Morocco.

Synopsis
After discovering his mother's adultery, and after his father's death, a child decides to commit suicide to put an end to his suffering.

Awards
 Las Palmas 2007
 Martil 2007
 Film Arabe Argelia 2007
 Ismailia 2007
 Damasco 2007
 Festival Nacional de Cine Marroquí 2007

External links

2006 films
Moroccan drama films